Eid og Voll (historically: Voll og Eid) is a former municipality in Møre og Romsdal county, Norway.  The  municipality encompassed most of the northwestern part of the present-day Rauma Municipality from 1840 until its dissolution in 1874.  The administrative centre was the village of Voll.  Other villages in the municipality were Innfjorden and Eidsbygda.

History
The municipality of Voll og Eid was established on 1 January 1840 when it was split away from Grytten municipality.  According to the 1835 census the municipality had a population of 1,211.  

Soon after the municipality was created, talk of dividing it began.  On 10 September 1862, the Torvik, Monsås, and Hagen farms in Grytten Municipality were transferred to Voll og Eid Municipality.  In 1863, the name was switched to Eid og Voll.  On 1 January 1874, Eid og Voll Municipality was divided to create two municipalities: Eid (population: 1,048) and Voll (population: 695).  

On 1 January 1964, these two municipalities were merged with the municipalities of Grytten, Hen, and part of Veøy to form the new Rauma Municipality.

See also
List of former municipalities of Norway

References

Rauma, Norway
Former municipalities of Norway
1840 establishments in Norway
1874 disestablishments in Norway